Desmia chryseis is a moth in the family Crambidae. It was described by George Hampson in 1898. It is found in Venezuela and Peru.

The wingspan is about 32 mm. The forewings are orange yellow with a purplish-fuscous antemedial line and base of the costa. The terminal third is purplish fuscous except on the costa. The hindwings have a purplish-fuscous band on the termen.

References

Moths described in 1898
Desmia
Moths of South America